Luke Joseph Cummo (born April 27, 1980) is an American former mixed martial artist. A professional from 2002 until 2008, he is  perhaps best remembered for his stint in the UFC and being a finalist on the reality TV series The Ultimate Fighter 2 on Spike TV.

Mixed martial arts career

Early career
Cummo fights out of Long Island, where he attended Chaminade High School (class of 1998) in Mineola, New York and works with (Matt Serra) Serra Jiu-Jitsu and Ray Longo's IMAA.  Although his grappling ability has been improving, his primary style remains Muay Thai kickboxing. He also holds a Brazilian Jiu-Jitsu purple belt. He graduated Nassau Community College with a degree in Biology.

Cummo began his professional mixed martial arts career in 2002, fighting exclusively in the Ring of Combat promotion in New Jersey. Over two-and-a-half years, he amassed a record of 3 wins and 2 losses.

The Ultimate Fighter 2
In 2005, Cummo was selected to be a contestant on The Ultimate Fighter 2 season. He gained recognition on the show due to his personality, vegan and unorthodox diet (which according to Joe Rogan includes urine therapy when sick), his striking ability and his love of comic books. He was also the last person picked for a team on the show, fighting throughout the show as the underdog.

In his first fight, Cummo defeated Anthony Torres by unanimous decision after three rounds. In the semi-finals, Cummo faced Sammy Morgan and won by knockout via a knee at 2:05 of the second round. After winning two exhibition fights, he made it to the finals against Joe Stevenson.

Ultimate Fighting Championship
Cummo faced Joe Stevenson in an officially sanction bout at The Ultimate Fighter 2 Finale on November 5, 2005. He lost the bout via a unanimous decision. Even though Cummo lost to Stevenson, his performance earned him a UFC contract.

In Cummo's first match under a UFC contract at UFC Ultimate Fight Night 4, he defeated Jason Von Flue via unanimous decision.

In his next fight, Cummo was defeated by Canadian fighter Jonathan Goulet, who scored a decision victory over Cummo with superior wrestling and ground control.

Cummo then amassed a two fight win streak when he defeated Josh Haynes via knockout at UFC 69 on April 7, 2007 and defeated Edilberto de Oliveira via TKO at UFC Fight Night 11 on September 19, 2007.

Cummo next faced Luigi Fioravanti at UFC 82 on March 1, 2008. He lost the fight via unanimous decision.

Cummo's last fight was a unanimous decision loss to Tamdan McCrory at UFC 87. His UFC record stands at 3 wins and 4 losses.

Personal life
Luke and his ex-wife Lara have two sons, Zachary Michael, who was born on October 7, 2007, and Maxwell Joseph, born April 24, 2009.

Urine therapy
Cummo has endorsed urine therapy, which is the drinking of one's own urine. He has stated that this gives him an advantage over the competition due to the supposed nutritional benefits that it provides.

Championships and accomplishments
Ultimate Fighting Championship
Fight of the Night (One time) vs. Jonathan Goulet

Mixed martial arts record

|-
| Loss
| align=center| 6–6
| Tamdan McCrory
| Decision (unanimous)
| UFC 87
| 
| align=center| 3
| align=center| 5:00
| Minneapolis, Minnesota, United States
| 
|-
| Loss
| align=center| 6–5
| Luigi Fioravanti
| Decision (unanimous)
| UFC 82
| 
| align=center| 3
| align=center| 5:00
| Columbus, Ohio, United States
| 
|-
| Win
| align=center| 6–4
| Edilberto de Oliveira
| TKO (strikes)
| UFC Fight Night 11
| 
| align=center| 1
| align=center| 1:45
| Las Vegas, Nevada, United States
| 
|-
| Win
| align=center| 5–4
| Josh Haynes
| KO (punch)
| UFC 69
| 
| align=center| 2
| align=center| 2:45
| Houston, Texas, United States
| 
|-
| Loss
| align=center| 4–4
| Jonathan Goulet
| Decision (majority)
| UFC Fight Night 5
| 
| align=center| 3
| align=center| 5:00
| Las Vegas, Nevada, United States
| 
|-
| Win
| align=center| 4–3
| Jason Von Flue
| Decision (unanimous)
| UFC Fight Night 4
| 
| align=center| 3
| align=center| 5:00
| Las Vegas, Nevada, United States
| 
|-
| Loss
| align=center| 3–3
| Joe Stevenson
| Decision (unanimous)
| The Ultimate Fighter 2 Finale
| 
| align=center| 3
| align=center| 5:00
| Las Vegas, Nevada, United States
| 
|-
| Loss
| align=center| 3–2
| Josh Koscheck
| Decision (unanimous)
| Ring of Combat 6
| 
| align=center| 3
| align=center| 5:00
| Elizabeth, New Jersey, United States
|Catchweight (175 lbs) bout.
|-
| Win
| align=center| 3–1
| Mike Thatcher
| Submission (triangle choke)
| Ring of Combat 5
| 
| align=center| 2
| align=center| 1:53
| Elizabeth, New Jersey, United States
|Middleweight bout.
|-
| Loss
| align=center| 2–1
| Dave Tirelli
| Decision (unanimous)
| Ring of Combat 4
| 
| align=center| 3
| align=center| 5:00
| Atlantic City, New Jersey, United States
|Catchweight (175 lbs) bout.
|-
| Win
| align=center| 2–0
| Dave Tirelli
| TKO (doctor stoppage)
| Ring of Combat 3
| 
| align=center| 2
| align=center| 0:46
| Morristown, New Jersey, United States
|Catchweight (175 lbs) bout.
|-
| Win
| align=center| 1–0
| Kadir Kadri
| TKO
| Ring of Combat 1
| 
| align=center| 1
| align=center| 2:37
| Uncasville, Connecticut, United States
|

See also 
List of vegans

References

External links

 
 
 
 
 Interview (Bout Review USA, Oct 2005)
 Interview (Ground & Pound, Aug 2007)
 Interview (Colin Timberlake, Aug 2009)

1980 births
American male mixed martial artists
Mixed martial artists from New York (state)
Living people
Chaminade High School alumni
American people of Italian descent
People from New Hyde Park, New York
Welterweight mixed martial artists
Mixed martial artists utilizing Muay Thai
Mixed martial artists utilizing Brazilian jiu-jitsu
American practitioners of Brazilian jiu-jitsu
American Muay Thai practitioners
Nassau Community College alumni
Ultimate Fighting Championship male fighters